Andrzej Tomasz Kosztowniak (born 31 March 1976) is a Polish politician. He is a member of the Law and Justice party and was the mayor of Radom from November 2006 to November 2014, when he was succeeded by Radosław Witkowski.

Biography
Kosztowniak was born on 31 March 1976 in Radom, Poland and attended the Maria Curie-Skłodowska University.

See also
 List of Law and Justice politicians

References

External links
 

Living people
1976 births
Law and Justice politicians
People from Radom
Members of the Polish Sejm 2015–2019
Members of the Polish Sejm 2019–2023